Butanilicaine is a local anesthetic. It is also known by the name Hostacaine.

Synthesis

The amide formation between 2-Chloro-6-Methylaniline [87-63-8] (1) and Chloroacetyl chloride (2) gives 2-Chloro-n-(2-chloro-6-methylphenyl)acetamide [6307-67-1] (3). Alkylation with N-Butylamine (4) completed the synthesis of Butanilicaine (5).

References

Local anesthetics
Acetanilides
Chloroarenes